Nothopanus is a genus of fungus in the family Marasmiaceae. The genus was circumscribed by American mycologist Rolf Singer in 1944.

See also
List of Marasmiaceae genera

References

Marasmiaceae
Agaricales genera
Taxa named by Rolf Singer